Untamed Justice is a 1929 American silent action film directed by Harry S. Webb and starring Virginia Brown Faire, Gaston Glass and David Torrence.

Cast
 Virginia Brown Faire as 	Louise Hill
 Gaston Glass as 	Norman Bard, Air Mail Pilot
 David Torrence as George Morrow, Investment Broker
 Philo McCullough as 	Herbert Winslow
 Alice Lake as 	Ann
 Tom London as Henchman Jim
 Sheldon Lewis as 	Sheriff
 Muro the Dog as 	Muro 
Arab the Horse as Arab

References

Bibliography
 Connelly, Robert B. The Silents: Silent Feature Films, 1910-36, Volume 40, Issue 2. December Press, 1998.
 Munden, Kenneth White. The American Film Institute Catalog of Motion Pictures Produced in the United States, Part 1. University of California Press, 1997.

External links
 

1929 films
1920s action films
1920s English-language films
American silent feature films
American action films
American black-and-white films
Films directed by Harry S. Webb
1920s American films